Sweet Trade is a 2007 album by The Poodles.

Track listing

References

2007 albums
The Poodles albums